Lotte Vandendriessche (born  Turnhout) is a Belgian female volleyball player. She is part of the Belgium women's national volleyball team.

She competed at the 2018 FIVB Volleyball Women's Nations League. 
On club level she plays for VC Oudegem.

Clubs

References

External links 
 http://www.volleyball.world/en/womensfinals/competition/teams/bel-belgium/players/lotte-vandendriessche?id=64415
 http://www.bvbinfo.com/player.asp?ID=15778
 https://www.cev.eu/Competition-Area/PlayerDetails.aspx?TeamID=10588&PlayerID=58981&ID=1037

1997 births
Living people
Belgian women's volleyball players
Wing spikers
Sportspeople from Turnhout
21st-century Belgian women